Agnesium is a neologism coined to describe a powerful, efficient and effective organization as an entity. Agnesium is a combination of agnes (Latin for powerful, efficient and effective) and the suffix -ium (indicating a biological structure).

The basic principle of Agnesium is that for complex structures or organizations there are many interdependencies between the members that are not known, understood or leveraged. By recognizing, understanding and leveraging these hidden interdependencies an organization can be proactive, adaptive and exploitative.

References 

Brand management
Business intelligence terms
Innovation economics